Davor Dretar, also known as Drele (born 13 September 1966) is a Croatian singer, radio presenter and television presenter. He is also a founding member of musical group "Dreletronic".

He was a host of Croatian reality show "Farma". In 2009, he competed in the Croatian Radiotelevision popular show "Zvijezde pjevaju", which is the Croatian version of the show Just the Two of Us (TV series) and had eventually finished the season on fifth place with his singing mate, a well known singer Zorica Kondža. He also made minor appearance in television sitcoms "Stipe u gostima", "Bitange i princeze" and "Zauvijek susjedi".

During the year 2007 he entered the Guinness World Records with his colleague Kristijan Petrović for longest hosting of a talk-show ever. It was performed as a part of annually held entertainment festival Špancirfest and it lasted 35 hours and 16 minutes. At present he is working as radio presenter of morning programme on Narodni radio radio station.

Filmography

Television appearances
 "Stipe u gostima" as Klempi / štef
 "Bitange i princeze" as Drele (2007)
 "Zauvijek susjedi" as Joža Bednjanec

Television and radio presenter
 "Narodni radio"
 "Farma" as presenter (2008–2010)
 "Zvijezde pjevaju" as competitor (2009)
 "Genijalci" as competitor

References

1966 births
Living people
Croatian radio presenters
Croatian television presenters
Croatian male actors
Croatian male film actors
20th-century Croatian male singers
Croatian pop singers
Television people from Zagreb
Musicians from Zagreb
Male actors from Zagreb
Representatives in the modern Croatian Parliament